Crash 'N Score is a two-player arcade video  game released by Atari, Inc. in 1975. A modified version of the game was released in Europe under the name Stock Car.

Gameplay
Gameplay is a simulation of a demolition derby, in which players compete by smashing each other and running over randomly appearing numbered flags within an allotted time. Players can choose to play with or without barriers.

References

Arcade video games
Arcade-only video games
1975 video games
Atari arcade games
Discrete video arcade games
Video games developed in the United States